The Rural Municipality of Garden River No. 490 is a rural municipality (RM) in the Canadian province of Saskatchewan within Census Division No. 15 and  Division No. 5.

History 
The RM of Russia No. 490 was originally incorporated as a rural municipality on January 1, 1913. Its name was changed to the RM of Garden River No. 490 on March 24, 1928.

Geography

Communities and localities 
The following urban municipalities are surrounded by the RM.

Villages
Albertville
Meath Park
Weirdale

Demographics 

Government 
The RM of Garden River No. 490 is governed by an elected municipal council and an appointed administrator that meets on the second Friday of every month. The reeve of the RM is Ryan Scragg while its administrator is Rebecca Matthews. The RM's office is located in Meath Park.

Transportation 
Roads
Highway 355—runs east/west starting at Meath Park and continues across Highway 2 then ends at Sturgeon Lake. serves Albertville, and Meath Park within the RM of Garden River No. 490
Highway 55—a mainly north south section north of Meath Park
Highway 120—a mainly north south section south of Meath Park

See also 
List of rural municipalities in Saskatchewan

References 

G

Division No. 15, Saskatchewan